Fred H. Clapp was an American football and basketball coach.

Football
Clapp was the fifth head football coach at the Southwestern College in Winfield, Kansas, serving for five years, from 1909 to 1913, and compiling a record of 24–11–6.

Racial integration
In 1913, Clapp fielded an African American player for his team.  Kansas Normal School (now called Pittsburg State University) officially launched a formal protest against the appearance of the player.  In that same game, a player named Fred Hamilton was playing left halfback and was injured to the extent of having a broken neck and paralyzed arms.  The game ended in a 6-6 tie.

The "Jinx"
The year 1914 proved especially important to Southwestern College lore.  On November 8, 1912, Southwestern defeated Fairmont College (now Wichita State University) by a score of 41 to 3. This was the first of a series of wins where Southwestern would beat or tie Fairmont ten of eleven games.  This period of time earned the school the name "The Jinx" for many years to come.

Basketball
Clapp also coached men's basketball at Southwestern and was the second person on record to hold that post.  He coached for five seasons, from 1909 until 1914.  His record was 39 wins and 24 losses.

Head coaching record

Football

References

Year of birth missing
Year of death missing
Southwestern Moundbuilders football coaches
Southwestern Moundbuilders men's basketball coaches